FC Bogzești  is a Moldovan football club based in Bogzești, Moldova. They play in the Moldovan "B" Division, the third division in Moldovan football in season 2015–2016 and win Division B Center.

Achievements
Divizia B
 Winners (1): 2015–16

External links
 on Soccerway.com

Football clubs in Moldova
Association football clubs established in 2015
2015 establishments in Moldova